Yukalikulevo (Yükälekül) is a rural locality (a village) in Ibrayevsky Selsoviet, Kiginsky District, Bashkortostan, Russia. The population was 648 as of 2010. There are 8 streets.

Geography 
Yukalikulevo is located 20 km southwest of Verkhniye Kigi (the district's administrative centre) by road. Yelgildino is the nearest rural locality.

References 

Rural localities in Kiginsky District